Giuseppe Lörks (born in 1876 in Hanselaer) was a German clergyman and bishop for the Roman Catholic Diocese of Wewak. He was appointed bishop in 1928. He died in 1945.

References 

1876 births
1945 deaths
German Roman Catholic bishops
Roman Catholic bishops of Wewak